Rollin Furbeck House is a Frank Lloyd Wright designed house in Oak Park, Illinois that was built in 1897. It is part of the Frank Lloyd Wright-Prairie School of Architecture Historic District.

Architecture 

The house is considered a major transitional work for Wright as his previous designs  were either square or rectangular, unlike this one, which holds (see the porches extruding toward the east and west) one of the first cruciform-pinwheel layout made by Wright.

Exterior 

Characteristics yet unseen in previous Frank Lloyd Wright designs, this house points to it being one of the first he constructed experimenting with vertical elements (such as the considerably large three-story center tower and vertical octagon-shaped columns).
Other recurrent Wright features consist of the continuation of the surface used on a story to the next story; the path to a front entrance purposefully obscured by the architect; the use of geometric shapes simple in design; and the implementation of  visually-protective colonnettes in front of textured diamond-paned windows, typical Wright characteristics which can be found in many other of his works.

Interior 

Not unlike many other of his works, Wright used an abundant source of natural light to allow a free flow of space; a characteristic which purpose is to give the impression of space even when there is none; woodwork was also used to create an ambient effect of warmth and coziness. Some of the first, nowadays very used in suburban residential homes features such as picture windows, suggestively the first used in a private single-family house in that period of history are also used. Note that many of Wright's more traditional characteristics usually found in his more early works can also be found in this residence, i.e. the large massive concrete fireplace woven into a wall, or diamond-paned windows.

References

 Storrer, William Allin. The Frank Lloyd Wright Companion. University Of Chicago Press, 2006,  (S.044; S.044A)

Oak Park, Illinois
Frank Lloyd Wright Prairie School of Architecture Historic District
Historic district contributing properties in Illinois
Houses on the National Register of Historic Places in Cook County, Illinois